The Natural History Museum of Tripoli is a museum located in Tripoli, Libya. It was developed by Professor Zahid Baig Mirza (Z. B. Mirza).

See also 

 List of museums in Libya
 List of natural-history museums

References 

Museums with year of establishment missing
Museums in Tripoli, Libya
Natural history museums